"I Give You My Heart" is a song by German Eurodance group Mr. President, released in July 1996 as the second single from their second album, We See the Same Sun (1996). It was the group's seventh released single and was certified gold in Germany. And it peaked within the top 10 in Chile, Czech Republic, Finland, Germany, Hungary and Switzerland. The accompanying music video features the group performing the song in a movie theater.

Chart performance
"I Give You My Heart" proved to be successful on the charts in Europe. Although it didn't reach the same level of success as "Coco Jamboo", it made it to the top 10 in Czech Republic, Finland, Germany, Hungary and Switzerland. Additionally, the single was a top 20 hit in Austria, Denmark and Norway, while on the Eurochart Hot 100, it peaked at number 25 in September 1996. It charted also in the United Kingdom, where it reached number 52 on the UK Singles Chart. Outside Europe, "I Give You My Heart" was a top 10 hit in Chile, where it hit number nine. It was awarded with a gold record in Germany, after 250,000 singles were sold.

Critical reception
British magazine Music Week rated the song three out of five, adding, "Totally uncool, but this is one of those infectious Europop anthems where no sonic trick is left unexploited. A fun outing which should follow Coco Jamboo into the charts."

Music video
The accompanying music video for "I Give You My Heart" was directed by John Buche & Florian Kehrer. It was released alongside the single and features the band's lineup singing at the Filmcasino theatre in Vienna, while different people watch a silent movie. Buche also directed the music video for "Coco Jamboo".

Track listings
 CD maxi - Europe (1996)
 "I Give You My Heart" (Radio Edit) - 3:37
 "I Give You My Heart" (Extended Edit)	- 5:43
 "I Give You My Heart" (Robin Masters' Club Mix) - 5:08
 "I Give You My Heart" (Steven Edwards' Kick Drum Mix) - 5:21
 "I Give You My Heart" (Video Version)	- 3:51
 "I Give You My Heart" (Candy Stations President Mix) - 5:16

Charts and certifications

Weekly charts

Year-end charts

Sales and certifications

References

1996 singles
1996 songs
Mr. President (band) songs
Electropop songs
Warner Records singles